CJ Dippre is an American football tight end for the Alabama Crimson Tide. He previously played for the Maryland Terrapins.

Early life and high school career
Dippre and grew up in Scranton, Pennsylvania and attended Lakeland Junior/Senior High School. He played quarterback, tight end, and defensive end on the football team. As a junior, Dippre threw 19 touchdown passes, rushed for 15 touchdowns and had four touchdown receptions. He was also named All-Region and the Lackawanna Conference Defensive Player of the Year on defense after making 43 tackles with 12 tackles for loss and 5.5 sacks. Dippre was rated a three-star recruit and committed to play college football at Maryland from 17 scholarship offers. Dippre also competed in discus and placed third in the PIAA Class AA State Championship meet as a junior and senior.

College career

Maryland 
Dippre began his college career at Maryland. He played in all 13 of the Terrapins' games during his freshman season and caught three passes for 25 yards. Dippre was Maryland's primary tight end as a sophomore and had 30 receptions for 314 yards and three touchdowns in 12 games. Dippre entered the NCAA transfer portal at the end of the regular season.

Alabama 
Dippre ultimately transferred to Alabama over offers from Nebraska, Rutgers, Illinois, Syracuse, Ole Miss, NC State, West Virginia, and South Carolina.

References

External links
Maryland Terrapins bio

Living people
American football tight ends
Alabama Crimson Tide football players
Maryland Terrapins football players
Players of American football from Pennsylvania
Year of birth missing (living people)